The Albuquerque Six-Guns were a professional ice hockey team playing in Albuquerque, New Mexico, USA. They were in the Central Hockey League in the 1973-74 season only. They played in the Tingley Coliseum.

They were set up as a farm team of the Kansas City Scouts but that team did not enter the National Hockey League until the following season. The Six-Guns were forced to look to other National Hockey League teams for players.

Coached by John Choyce, they finished the 1973-74 season with a record of 16-54-16-48 189-263. They finished in 6th place and were out of playoffs.

Player roster
Note: No. = Jersey Number; GP = Games played; G = Goals; A = Assists; Pts = Points; PIM = Penalty minutes

References

External links
Albuquerque Six-Guns profile at The Internet Hockey Database

Central Professional Hockey League teams
Ice hockey teams in New Mexico
1973 establishments in New Mexico
1974 disestablishments in New Mexico
Ice hockey clubs established in 1973
Ice hockey clubs disestablished in 1974
Sports in Albuquerque, New Mexico